Ooparwala Jane is a 1977 Bollywood film directed by Naresh Saigal. The film stars Vinod Mehra and Rehana Sultan.

Soundtrack
The film has only one track.
"Jo Na Bujhe Aesi Aag" - Noor Jehan

References

External links
 

1977 films
1970s Hindi-language films
Films scored by Laxmikant–Pyarelal